Cox-Parks House is a historic home located at Charleston, West Virginia.  Emma Cox, the wife of Frank Cox, leader of several coal companies in the Kanawha Valley, had this home built for herself in about 1925 when she gave the old "Home Hill" to her daughter's family.  It is an elaborate bungalow in the Prairie School-style.  The exterior features clean white stucco and green tile and a double entrance and flanking double windows, housed by a recessed porch.

It was listed on the National Register of Historic Places in 1984 as part of the South Hills Multiple Resource Area.

References

Houses in Charleston, West Virginia
Bungalow architecture in West Virginia
Houses completed in 1925
Houses on the National Register of Historic Places in West Virginia
National Register of Historic Places in Charleston, West Virginia
Prairie School architecture in West Virginia